Siegfried Wischnewski (15 April 1922 – 24 January 1989) was a German stage and film actor.

Career
Wischnewski was born in the Masurian village of Saborowen, then in German East Prussia (today Zaborowo, Poland) to a peasant labourer. He decided to become an actor after he appeared at a school theater, but was conscripted into Nazi Germany's Kriegsmarine after he had passed his Abitur at the Arndt-Gymnasium at Berlin-Dahlem in 1940. As a professional actor he appeared at the theater of Lüneburg in 1946 and in the following years at several other stages in Germany.

In the late 1950s and 1960s he became well known for his TV-appearances, often as a police detective. He played several roles in popular TV-productions like The Squeaker, Tatort, Derrick or Der Kommissar but also in movie versions of Brecht's Dreigroschenoper (1962) or the Nibelungen (1966/67).

Probably his most significant success was the role of a veterinary in the 1980s TV-production Ein Heim für Tiere. Wischnewski was twice married to the actress Suzanne Ritter, from 1948 till 1956 and 1963 till Wischnewski's death of bronchial cancer at Königswinter in 1989.

Selected filmography
 Jons und Erdme (1959)
 The Last Witness (1960)
 The Liar (1961)
 He Can't Stop Doing It (1962)
 The Squeaker (1963)
  (1963)
  (1964, TV miniseries)
  (1964, TV film)
  (1966, TV miniseries)
 Die Nibelungen (1966/67)
 Dead Run (1967)
 The Long Day of Inspector Blomfield (1968)
 Maximilian von Mexiko (1970, TV miniseries)
  (1970)
  (1973, TV miniseries)
 Zwei himmlische Dickschädel (1974)
 Derrick - Season 2, Episode 10: "Kamillas junger Freund" (1975, TV)
  (1976)
 Sladek oder Die schwarze Armee (1976, TV film)
  (1976, TV film)
 Die Quelle (1979, TV film)
  (1979, TV film)
 Derrick - Season 6, Episode 05: "Die Puppe" (1979, TV)
 Derrick - Season 7, Episode 03: "Ein Lied aus Theben" (1980, TV)
 Derrick - Season 7, Episode 10: "Eine unheimlich starke Persönlichkeit" (1980, TV)
 Exil (1981, TV miniseries)
 Derrick - Season 10, Episode 3: "Geheimnisse einer Nacht" (1983, TV)
  (1984, TV miniseries)

References

External links
 

1922 births
1989 deaths
German male film actors
German male stage actors
German male television actors
People from East Prussia
Deaths from cancer in Germany
20th-century German male actors